Justice Ramesh Ranganathan (born 28 July 1958) is an Indian judge. He is the former Chief Justice of the Uttarakhand High Court. He had earlier served as the Acting Chief Justice of Hyderabad High Court and judge of Andhra Pradesh High Court.

See also
List of Chief Justices of the Uttarakhand High Court
List of Chief Justices of India

References

1958 births
Living people
Indian judges
Chief Justices of the Uttarakhand High Court
Judges of the Andhra Pradesh High Court